D83  may refer to:
 Boonville Airport (California)
 HMS Broke (D83)
 Greek destroyer Spetsai (D83)
 Grünfeld Defence, Encyclopaedia of Chess Openings code